Maria Kublitz-Kramer is a German literary scholar and was a lecturer at the Oberstufen-Kolleg Bielefeld.

Life 
Kublitz-Kramer studied German  in Paderborn and obtained a Doctorate (PhD) in 1995. From 1989 to 1996, she was a research assistant in the Department of General Literary Studies at the University of GH Paderborn. She taught the subject German at the Oberstufenkolleg Bielefeld, was Academic Director at Bielefeld University and from 2003 to 2007 was Deputy Academic Director of the Oberstufen-Kolleg.

Kublitz-Kramer was co-founder of the literature series "Readings on Field 2" at the Oberstufenkolleg and published numerous texts.

Main areas of work 
Her work focuses on literary studies and gender, literary theory and didactics, Jewish authors as well as cultural studies topics and interdisciplinary teaching (project management).

Further reading 
 Das Ende des Exils? Briefe von Frauen nach 1945 Inge Hansen-Schaberg, Irene Below, Maria Kublitz-Kramer 2014 
 Ich habe arbeiten gelernt, aber nicht leben. Über Werk und Wirkung der Germanistin Käte Laserstein. Eine Fallstudie 2011 
 Was braucht die Oberstufe?: Diagnose, Förderung und selbstständiges Lernen, Josef Keuffer,  Maria Kublitz-Kramer 2008 
 Das Politische wird persönlich–Familiengeschichte(n) Erfahrungen und Verarbeitung von Exil und Verfolgung im Leben der Töchter Inge Hansen-Schaberg, Maria Kublitz-Kramer, Ortrun Niethammer, Renate Wall, 2007 
 Echolos: Klangwelten verfolgter Musikerinnen in der NS-Zeit, Anna-Christine Rhode-Jüchtern and Maria Kublitz-Kramer, 2004 
 Trauer tragen–Trauer zeigen: Inszenierungen der Geschlechter Gisela Ecker, Maria Kublitz-Kramer, 2001 
 Frauen auf Strassen: Topographien des Begehrens in Erzähltexten von Gegenwartsautorinnen, 1995

References

External links 
 

Literary scholars
Gender studies academics
Date of birth missing
German women